Magi may refer to either of these two languages of Papua New Guinea:
Magi language (Central Province), a Mailuan language
Magi language (Madang Province), a Madang language